Major general (abbreviated MAJGEN) is a senior rank of the Australian Army, and was created as a direct equivalent of the British military rank of major general. It is the third-highest active rank of the Australian Army (the rank of field marshal not being held by any currently serving officer), and is considered to be equivalent to a two-star rank. A major general commands a division or the equivalent.

Major general is a higher rank than brigadier, but lower than lieutenant general. Major general is the equivalent of rear admiral in the Royal Australian Navy and air vice marshal in the Royal Australian Air Force.

The insignia for a major general is the star (or 'pip') of the Order of the Bath (despite membership of the Order no longer being awarded to Australians), above a crossed Mameluke sword and baton.

See also 

 Australian Defence Force ranks and insignia
 Australian Army officer rank insignia
 List of Australian Army generals

References and notes

Notes

References

Army
 
Australian Army